Zabrus aegaeus is a species ground beetle in the Pterostichinae subfamily that is endemic to Greece.

References

Beetles described in 1904
Beetles of Europe
Endemic fauna of Greece
Zabrus